Phantom Antichrist is the 13th studio album by German thrash metal band Kreator, released through Nuclear Blast on 1 June 2012.

The album entered the US Billboard 200 at No. 130, selling 3,900 copies in the first week.

Release and promotion 
The album's title track was released as a limited edition 7" vinyl single, which sold out very quickly. It has since been released digitally. The B-side is a cover of "The Number of the Beast" by Iron Maiden.

Kreator released a music video for "Civilization Collapse" on 28 November 2012.

Packaging 
The digipak edition includes a bonus DVD containing a documentary about the making of the album and a live set compiled from Kreator's performances at the Wacken Open Air festivals in 2008 and 2011.

A very limited edition version of the album is available through the Nuclear Blast online store, which comes in a metal box containing the CD+DVD version of the album, an exclusive live album called Harvesting the Grapes of Horror which contains the audio from the live portion of the DVD, a red T-shirt bearing the band's logo and the album title, a photocard signed by Mille Petrozza, an A1 poster of the album artwork, and a numbered certificate of authenticity.

Critical reception 

The album has a more progressive and melodic sound than previously explored by the band and was generally well received by critics. It won a 2012 Metal Storm Award for "Best Thrash Metal Album".

Track listing

Personnel
Phantom Antichrist album personnel adapted from the CD liner notes.

Kreator
 Mille Petrozza – lead vocals, guitars
 Sami Yli-Sirniö – guitars, backing vocals, acoustic guitar on the intro of "United in Hate"
 Christian Giesler – bass
 Ventor – drums

Production
 Jens Bogren – mixing, recording, producing at Fascination Street Studios, Sweden
 Ted Jensen – mastering at Sterling Sound, New York City
 Johan Örnborg – additional recording

Art
 Wes Benscoter – cover artwork
 Jan Meininghaus – additional cover artwork, booklet design
 Heile for Heilemania – band photos

Chart performance

References

External links 
 
  Phantom Antichrist at Nuclear Blast

2012 albums
Albums with cover art by Wes Benscoter
Kreator albums
Nuclear Blast albums
Albums produced by Jens Bogren